Domingue may refer to:

People

 Gerald Domingue (born 1937), American medical researcher
 Jean Domingue (born 1962), Canadian politician
 Michel Domingue, leader of Haiti from 1874 to 1876

Places

 Saint-Domingue, French colony from 1658 to 1804 later named Haiti